The 2009–10 Clemson Tigers women's basketball team will represent the University of Clemson in the 2009–2010 NCAA Division I basketball season. The team will be coached by Cristy McKinney. The Tigers are a member of the Atlantic Coast Conference and will attempt to win an NCAA championship.

Offseason
June 25: Clemson has announced the addition of Marla Brumfield to her staff as an assistant coach. Brumfield, was an All-American at Rice.
July 17: Christie Rogers has the joined the Tigers as a graduate assistant coach. She will work toward a master's degree in youth development leadership starting in the fall.
Aug. 14: The Clemson Women's Basketball team wrapped up a successful western Canadian Tour, with a 4-2 record. The Lady Tigers played two games against the Canadian National team, and one each versus the University of British Columbia, Trinity Western, University College of the Fraser Valley, and Vancouver Island University. Clemson is widely regarded as the first women's team from a major NCAA conference to visit many of these universities. Clemson won the four games without All-ACC player Lele Hardy, who made the trip but was unable to participate due to injury.

Canadian tour

Exhibition

Regular season

Roster

Schedule
The Tigers will compete in the WBCA Classic in Storrs, CT from November 27–29.

ACC tournament

Player stats

Postseason

NCAA tournament

Awards and honors

Team players drafted into the WNBA

See also
2009–10 ACC women’s basketball season
List of Atlantic Coast Conference women's basketball regular season champions
List of Atlantic Coast Conference women's basketball tournament champions

References

External links
Official Site

Clemson
Clemson Tigers women's basketball seasons
Clemson Tig
Clemson Tig